Krivyye Ozyora is a rural locality (a settlement) in Pinezhskoye Rural Settlement of Pinezhsky District, Arkhangelsk Oblast, Russia. The population was 162 as of 2010. There are 4 streets.

Geography 
Krivyye Ozyora is located 155 km northwest of Karpogory (the district's administrative centre) by road. Voyepala is the nearest rural locality.

References 

Rural localities in Pinezhsky District